Uroš Elezović (born 28 January 1982) is a Serbian former handball player.

Club career
After starting out at Vrbas, Elezović played for Sintelon, before moving abroad. He would go on to play in Slovenia, France, Switzerland, Qatar, Israel and Hungary. With Vojvodina, Elezović won three consecutive national championships (2012–13, 2013–14 and 2014–15).

International career
At international level, Elezović represented Serbia at the 2016 European Championship.

Personal life
Elezović is the son of fellow handball player Jovica Elezović.

Honours
Kadetten Schaffhausen
 Swiss Handball League: 2011–12
Vojvodina
 Serbian Handball Super League: 2012–13, 2013–14, 2014–15
 Serbian Handball Cup: 2014–15
 Serbian Handball Super Cup: 2013, 2014, 2016

References

External links
 MKSZ record
 

1982 births
Living people
Sportspeople from Banja Luka
Serbs of Bosnia and Herzegovina
Serbian male handball players
RK Vrbas players
RK Sintelon players
RK Vojvodina players
RK Proleter Zrenjanin players
Expatriate handball players
Serbian expatriate sportspeople in Slovenia
Serbian expatriate sportspeople in France
Serbian expatriate sportspeople in Switzerland
Serbian expatriate sportspeople in Qatar
Serbian expatriate sportspeople in Israel
Serbian expatriate sportspeople in Hungary